John Cockburn (– 12 November 1758) of Ormiston, East Lothian, was a Scottish landowner and politician who sat in the Parliament of Scotland from 1702 to 1707 and as a Whig in the British House of Commons for 34 years from 1707 to 1741.

Life

Cockburn was the nephew of Adam Cockburn of Ormiston, Lord Justice Clerk, who had no male heir and from whom he inherited the Ormiston estate in 1735. In 1736 he laid out the "model village" of Ormiston which was set up to encourage craft industries such as brewing, distilling and weaving. However, this, and his improvements to the estate as a whole, bankrupted Cockburn, and he was forced to sell the entire estate and village to the Charles Hope, the Earl of Hopetoun.

He is known as the father of Scottish husbandry.

In 1702, Cockburn became a Shire Commissioner for Haddington in the Parliament of Scotland and took an active interest in accomplishing the union. He was the first representative of East Lothian in the parliament of the United Kingdom of Great Britain. He continued to hold that seat in all successive parliaments until 1741. He was one of the Lords Commissioners of the Admiralty.

Cockburn built Ormiston Hall on his estate at Ormiston. This last Cockburn of Ormiston was an enthusiastic entrepreneur and eventually ruined himself as a result of which his estates were sold to the Earl of Hopetoun.

Cockburn died in his son's house in the Navy Office, London, England. He had firstly married Beatrix, daughter of John Carmichael, 1st Earl of Hyndford, by whom he had no issue and secondly married Arabella, the daughter and coheiress of Anthony Rowe of Muswell Hall, Middlesex, with whom he had a son. His natural son, George Cockburne (d.1770), was a captain in the Royal Navy, and married Caroline, daughter of George Forrester, 5th Lord Forrester, with female issue.

References

External links
ElectricScotland Profile
 The House of Cockburn of that Ilk and Cadets Thereof, by Thomas H. Cockburn-Hood (Edinburgh, 1888), page 156.

17th-century births
1758 deaths
People from Ormiston
Lords of the Admiralty
Shire Commissioners to the Parliament of Scotland
Members of the Parliament of Scotland 1702–1707
Members of the Parliament of Great Britain for Scottish constituencies
British MPs 1707–1708
British MPs 1708–1710
British MPs 1710–1713
British MPs 1713–1715
British MPs 1715–1722
British MPs 1722–1727
British MPs 1727–1734
British MPs 1734–1741
Politics of East Lothian
Scottish agronomists
Scottish businesspeople
John